Sulphide Glacier is in North Cascades National Park in the U.S. state of Washington, on the south slopes of Mount Shuksan. Descending  from the summit tower  of Mount Shuksan, it is connected to Crystal Glacier to the east. Sulphide Glacier is along the route taken when Mount Shuksan was first climbed in 1906. Below these cascades lies Sulphide Lake, which empties over Sulphide Creek Falls, one of the highest waterfalls in North America with a nearly  drop.

See also
List of glaciers in the United States

References

Glaciers of the North Cascades
Glaciers of Whatcom County, Washington
Glaciers of Washington (state)